Group 7 was a set of regulations for automobile racing created by the Commission Sportive Internationale (CSI), a division of the modern Fédération Internationale de l'Automobile. 

There were two distinct sets of Group 7 regulations:
 Group 7 two-seater racing cars (1966 to 1975)
 Group 7 international formula racing cars (1976 to 1981)

Group 7 two-seater racing cars (1966 to 1975)

The FIA’s new Appendix J regulations for 1966 listed a category for "Group 9 two-seater racing cars" in its draft versions, but this was amended to "Group 7 two-seater racing cars" by the time of publication of the 1966 FIA Yearbook. The new Group 7 regulations specified that cars must be fitted with fenders, windshield, two seats, two doors, headlights, taillights, rollbar, a dual braking system and a self-starter and that they must utilize commercial gasoline.

Group 7 cars were defined as "two-seater competition vehicles built exclusively for speed races on closed circuit". There was no minimum production requirement necessary to earn homologation. As such, the regulations allowed manufacturers and teams freedom to create unique racing cars with no limitations on engines, tires, aerodynamics, or dimensions, as long as the car had room for two seats and was enclosed in bodywork. Races for Group 7 cars were generally short sprints, with few accommodations made for driver comfort.

Although the formula only existed for ten years, Group 7 was embraced by several series around the world, with the Sports Car Club of America running its United States Road Racing Championship for Group 7 cars from 1966 to 1968. Its Canadian-American Challenge Cup, better known as Can-Am, was also open to Group 7 cars from 1966 to 1974. In Europe, the Nordic Challenge Cup ran in 1969, replaced by the Interserie in 1970 before the series later adopted a Formula Libre format. Early editions of the Japanese Grand Prix were dominated by Group 7 cars built by Japanese manufacturers.

Many manufacturers became involved in Group 7, with McLaren and Porsche building the most dominant cars in the category.  Manufacturers Lola, Chaparral, Ferrari, BRM, Shadow, Nissan, Toyota, and Isuzu all built Group 7 cars, while big-block Chevrolet and Ford motors were the engines of choice throughout the world.

The formula was current through to 1975, with two-seater racing cars defined under Group 6 regulations from 1976.

Group 7 international formula racing cars (1976 to 1981)
From 1976 the FIA used the Group 7 designation for international formula racing cars. The new Group 7 encompassed International Formulae Nos 1, 2 and 3, better known as Formula 1, Formula 2 and Formula 3 respectively. It remained current through to 1981.

Groups 1-9

References

Racing car classes
Fédération Internationale de l'Automobile
Sports car racing